Sir John James Withers  (21 December 1863 – 29 December 1939) was a British politician. He was Conservative Member of Parliament (MP) for Cambridge University from 1926 to 1939.

Withers was a pupil at Eton College, and read law at King's College, Cambridge. He was appointed a Commander of the Order of the British Empire in the 1918 New Year Honours for his efforts during the First World War.

A by-election for one of the Cambridge University seats was held on 13 February 1926, when Withers was returned unopposed. He was knighted in the 1929 Dissolution Honours for political and public service.

He died in office, and was succeeded by Archibald Vivian Hill.

References

External links 
 

1863 births
1939 deaths
People educated at Eton College
Alumni of King's College, Cambridge
Presidents of the Alpine Club (UK)
Commanders of the Order of the British Empire
UK MPs 1924–1929
UK MPs 1929–1931
UK MPs 1931–1935
UK MPs 1935–1945
Members of the Parliament of the United Kingdom for the University of Cambridge
Conservative Party (UK) MPs for English constituencies
Knights Bachelor